Ronald Hilaire (born November 22, 1984) is a former Canadian football defensive lineman who is currently the head football coach at McGill University. He was drafted by the Calgary Stampeders in the fourth round of the 2008 CFL Draft. He played college football for the Buffalo Bulls. On February 17, 2015, Hilaire was named the 21st head coach of the McGill Redmen football team.

Personal life
Hilaire is of Haitian descent.

Head coaching record

References

External links
Calgary Stampeders bio

1984 births
Living people
Buffalo Bulls football players
Calgary Stampeders players
Canadian football defensive linemen
Canadian sportspeople of Haitian descent
McGill Redbirds football coaches
Montreal Carabins football coaches
Players of Canadian football from Quebec
Sportspeople from Laval, Quebec